This page shows the highest mountains in Austria as well as the highest mountains in each mountain range and in each of the Austrian states. The heights are given in metres above the Adriatic Sea.

Highest mountains in Austria 
This table lists about 150 Austrian summits above 3150 m with a topographic prominence of at least 150 m and nine peaks of note with a slightly lower re-ascent. Only those mountains with a prominence of 150 m or more are ranked.

Highest mountain of each range

The ranges correspond to those listed for Austria in the AVE. (→ see diagram)
If the highest mountain in a range is not within Austrian national territory it is not shown in the list. (e.g.: Piz Linard (3,411m), highest mountain in the Silvretta)

Highest mountain of each federal state

See also 

 Mountains in the Austrian federal states:
 Mountains in the Burgenland
 Mountains of Carinthia
 Mountains of Lower Austria
 Mountains of Upper Austria
 Mountains of Salzburg
 Mountains of the Styria
 Mountains of Tyrol
 Mountains of Vorarlberg
 Mountains of Vienna
 Mountains
 List of mountains of the Alps above 3000 m
 List of mountains of the Alps (2500-2999 m)
 List of highest mountains of Germany
 Mountain ranges
 List of mountain ranges
 List of mountain and hill ranges of Germany

Notes

Sources
Bundesamt für Eich- und Vermessungswesen, Austrian Map online
Günter Flaig, Silvretta Alpen, Bergverlag Rother, 2005, 
Walter Klier, Ötztaler Alpen, Bergverlag Rother, 2006, 
Walter Klier, Stubaier Alpen, Bergverlag Rother, 2006, 
Walter Klier, Zillertaler Alpen, Bergverlag Rother, 2005, 
Willi End and Hubert Peterka, Venedigergruppe, Bergverlag Rother, 2006, 
Willi End, Glockner- und Granatspitzgruppe, Bergverlag Rother, 2011, 
Classification of Eastern Alps are according to Mathias Zehring Alpenvereinseinteilung der Ostalpen, at bergalbum.de.
Prominence data for the highest mountain of each range are from Eberhard Jurgalski's Table of summits in the Alps separated by 590 metres of re-ascent.

External links 
List of the hundred highest mountains in Austria including their subpeaks
List and details of all 965 named Austrian summits of 3000 m or higher.

Austria
Austria
!Austria

Mountains
Aus